Royal Air Force Greencastle or more simply RAF Greencastle is a former Royal Air Force airfield located  south of the fishing village of Kilkeel and took in a large part of Cranfield Bay.

It was opened as an RAF bomber Operational Training Unit (OTU) in April 1942 but it was almost immediately transferred to the United States Army Air Forces (USAAF) and renamed AAF Stn 237.

History

Construction

Commencement of Aerodrome Construction 12 January 1942. Consulting engineers; Messrs Landon-Every And Ferkin Ltd. Main contractor; Messrs A.M. Carmichael (Scotland).

Some of the best agricultural land in the area was vested. Compensation, considered by some to be totally inadequate, was offered, but not always accepted.  In some cases households were asked to vacate their homes almost overnight.  Some people refused to move out and the station was literally built around them in the townlands of – Derryoge, Dunavil, Ballynahatten, Cranfield, and Grange.

Air Ministry Compulsory Acquisition orders gave the occupiers three days to get out, without obligation on the Air Ministry to find them alternatative accommodation.  This short notice period applied only to houses that were sited where the runways were going to be built.  Other home owners had more time to remove roofs and anything else that was salvageable.  Most of the farmers had their lands cultivated and ploughed all ready for the planting of early potatoes. Sheds were full of boxes of sprouted Arran Pilots ready to be planted.  (The early potato crop was important in this area of small (5-15 acres) family farms).

Around 450 buildings were erected of various shapes and sizes and at a safe distance from the Ammunition & Bomb Stores and Runways (as per detailed schedule).  A number of the foundations on the communal, living and other sites throughout the aerodrome which were excavated and concreted were never built upon.  Others were partly erected.  Also several construction site buildings were never used or lived in during the war years. Approximately 5 miles of water mains was laid to the aerodrome of 6"dia, class D pipe from the Silent Valley reservoir.  Ownership of this was ceded to the local authority when the station was closed.

Operations

The station was a satellite to RAF Langford Lodge (AAF Stn 597) and was established to handle the overflow from the extremely busy parent station.

From 1944 until the end of the war, salvage of both 8th and 9th AF war weary aircraft became an increasingly feverish aspect of work at both stations, as was the training of bomber crews.  Air gunners were trained at RAF Greencastle by the USAAF where the 4th Gunnery & Tow Target Flight were located with Douglas A-20 Havocs, Westland Lysanders and Vultee Vengeance A-35B's in the Consolidated B-24 Liberator gunnery school.

From May until August 1944 was classed as the busiest period of WW2, output in July alone being 330 heavy bomber crews from Greencastle and Cluntoe

The following RAF units were here at some point:
 No. 2708 Squadron RAF Regiment
 No. 2754 Squadron RAF Regiment
 No. 2755 Squadron RAF Regiment
 No. 2756 Squadron RAF Regiment
 No. 2775 Squadron RAF Regiment

Key Operational Dates

 April 1942, Built as an RAF bomber OTU but transferred to USAAF.
 May 1942, No. 2852 Sqn RAF formed.
 30 July 1942, opened but USAAF did not take over until 3 August 1943. 
 Between 1943 and February 1944, 5th Combat Crew Replacement Centre ground to air firing practice for B-24 Liberator bomber crews, later moved to RAF Cheddington.
 July 1944, 5th Replacement & Training Squadron (Bombardment) established at Greencastle.
 During 1944 it was a satellite air depot to RAF Langford Lodge with Boeing B-17 Flying Fortresses and B-24s.
 From 3 December 1943 until September 1944 it was used by the 4th Gunnery and Tow Target Flight with Havocs, Lysanders and Vengeance A-35B's in the B-24 gunnery school, later moved to RAF Chipping Ongar.
 February 1945 until May 1945 the 5th Airdrome Squadron was in control of air depot.
 On 31 May 1945 it was returned to RAF control.

Visit by Eisenhower

On 17 May 1944 General Dwight D. Eisenhower flew into the station for an inspection.  He was met by General Stafford LeRoy Irwin and viewed the 5th Infantry Division and Divisional artillery, which were drawn up on the airfield.

Current use

The airfield was returned to RAF control in 1945 and almost immediately closed down. In the 1960s the runways were broken up and the concrete used to construct boundary walls by the land owners.

Many of the buildings still exist but are in a derelict condition.  The basic layout of the station can still be seen from above but the signature of the runways is gone.  A caravan site occupies much of the southernmost portion.

Cranfield Loyal Orange Lodge 907 recently unfurled a new banner with a memorial to the American Army in the Cranfield and Greencastle area.

See also
 List of former Royal Air Force stations

References

Military units and formations established in 1942
Green
Buildings and structures in County Down
Military history of County Down
World War II sites in Northern Ireland
Green
Military history of Northern Ireland
Military installations in Northern Ireland
Defunct airports in Northern Ireland